Antey Concern was a defense industry company based in Moscow, Russia. In 2002 it was merged with NPO Almaz to form Almaz-Antey.

The Antey Concern specialized in the production of high-performance surface-to-air missile systems and sophisticated radio-engineering products. Antey produced the S-300V (SA-12) long-range anti-aircraft, anti-missile system and the Tor (SA-15) short-range battlefield system. Antey also specialized in the development and production of commercial refrigeration equipment, domestic radio electronic devices, and consumer goods. 

The Concern comprised two scientific research institutes and several large plants, including the Scientific Research Institute of Electromechanics (NIIEhM) and a machinery production plant in Volzhsk (Volzhskprodmash) that specialized in a wide range of refrigeration installations. Antey also reportedly included a co-located plant that produced printed circuits and other electronic products on an experimental scale.

References

Defence companies of Russia
Companies based in Moscow
Almaz-Antey
Defunct companies of Russia
Ministry of Radio Industry (Soviet Union)
Defence companies of the Soviet Union